Abdounia is an extinct genus of requiem shark which lived during the Paleogene period. It is mainly known from isolated teeth. It is one of the earliest requiem sharks, and attained widespread success in North America, Europe, and Africa.

Locations
They are known from the paleogene of Morocco, France, Belgium, Russia, North Carolina, Georgia, Alabama, and Virginia. In the lower Nanjemoy Formation of Virginia, they are the most common fossil shark tooth. By the end of the Oligocene Epoch the genus is severely reduced, probably due to competition with other Carcharhiniformes like Carcharhinus.

Species
The following are species currently attributed to this genus. Note this may be an under-representation of actual diversity, as living relatives have extremely similar teeth across species.
Abdounia africana (Danian-Thanetian)
Abdounia beaugei (Paleocene-Eocene )
Abdounia enniskelleni (Eocene)
Abdounia furimskyi (upper Eocene-Rupelian )
Abdounia lapierrei (Eocene )
Abdounia minutissima (Eocene )
Abdounia recticona ( Eocene)
Abdounia vassilyevae (Priabonian)
Abdounia lata (Priabonian)
Abdounia biauriculata (Ypresian)
Abdounia belselensis (Rupelian)

References

Prehistoric shark genera
Carcharhinidae